Tall larkspur is a common name for several flowering plants and may refer to:

Delphinium barbeyi, native to the western United States
Delphinium exaltatum, native to the eastern United States